Laura Benková (born 11 May 2000) is a Slovak swimmer. She competed in the women's 200 metre freestyle event at the 2018 FINA World Swimming Championships (25 m), in Hangzhou, China.

References

2000 births
Living people
Slovak female swimmers
Slovak female freestyle swimmers
Place of birth missing (living people)
21st-century Slovak women